The People's Party of Galicia (Galician/Spanish: Partido Popular de Galicia , PP or PPdeG ) is a conservative political party in Galicia, Spain. It is the Galician affiliate of the Spanish People's Party.

Prior to the 2005 Galician elections, the PPdeG had been in power for 15 years.  In the election  the party won one seat shy of an absolute majority.  The other two parties with deputies (Spanish Socialist Workers' Party and Galician Nationalist Bloc) were then able to form a governing coalition.

The party returned to power in the 2009 Galician elections, and has been the governing party since.

Organisation

Presidents
 Xerardo Fernández Albor (1989-1991)
 Manuel Fraga Iribarne (1991-2006)
 Alberto Núñez Feijoo (2006–2022)
 Alfonso Rueda (2022–present)

Secretary-Generals
 José Cuiña Crespo (1991-1999)
 Xesús Palmou (1999-2006)
 Alfonso Rueda (2006–2016)
 Miguel Tellado (2016–2022)
 Paula Prado del Río (2022–present)

Electoral performance

Parliament of Galicia

Cortes Generales

European Parliament

Notes

References

External links
Official
PPdeG
Novas Xeracions

Political parties established in 1989
Political parties in Galicia (Spain)
Conservative parties in Spain
Galicia